Lindsay Steven Posner (born 6 June 1959) is a British theatre director, known for his work in London's West End and at the Royal Court Theatre, the Royal Shakespeare Company and the National Theatre, particularly plays by David Mamet.

Career 
Lindsay Posner graduated from the acting course at the Royal Academy of Dramatic Art in 1984. He was associate director of the Royal Court Theatre from 1987 to 1992 where his production of Death and the Maiden won two Laurence Olivier Awards.

He has directed five productions of David Mamet's plays, describing him as "America's greatest living playwright".

Theatre
Posner was an associate director of the Royal Court Theatre between 1987 and 1992.  During this time, he directed a number of new plays.  Additionally, from 1989 he was appointed artistic director of Royal Court Theatre Upstairs and deputy director (to Artistic Director Max Stafford-Clark) for the main house. 

During the late 2000s and early 2010s, he has had success with revivals of modern British comedies such as Relatively Speaking, Abigail's Party and Noises Off.

Opera 
 Jenůfa by Leoš Janáček (1993) for the Opera Theatre Company in Dublin
 Giulio Cesare by Handel (1998) at the Royal Opera House at the Barbican Centre
 Man and Boy: Dada by Michael Nyman (2003) at the Almeida Theatre and in Jersey
 Love Counts by Michael Nyman (2006) at the Almeida Theatre

Television 
Posner has directed two television plays:
 The Maitlands (part of TV series Performance) in 1993, with Eileen Atkins, Bill Nighy, Harriet Walter, Jennifer Ehle, Edward Fox and Samuel West
 Two Oranges and a Mango in 1994, with Paul Bhattacharjee and Saeed Jaffrey

References

External links 
 Royal Court Theatre home page
 National Theatre home page
 

1959 births
Living people
British theatre directors
British opera directors
Alumni of RADA